Bactericera albiventris is a hemipteran bug in the family Triozidae, which causes galls on the leaves of willows (Salix species). It was first described by Arnold Förster in 1848.

Description of the gall
The gall is a small dimple (< 3 mm) on the underside of a willow leaf. Inside is a flat nymph which is surrounded with wax. The gall is raised on the upper surface of the leaf. If there is a heavy infestation, leaves (especially younger ones) may curl.

The galls are found on almond willow (Salix triandra), Babylon willow (S. babylonica), bay willow (S. pentandra), common osier (S. viminalis), crack willow (S. fragilis), eared willow (S. aurita), olive willow (S. elaeagnos), purple willow (S. purpurea) and white willow (S. alba).

Distribution
Bactericera albiventris has been recorded from western Europe.

References

External links
 British Bugs

Triozidae
Gall-inducing insects
Hemiptera of Europe
Insects described in 1848
Taxa named by Arnold Förster
Willow galls